Wilkin Arvind Mota (born 20 September 1981) is an Indian cricketer who plays for Tripura and formerly Kings XI Punjab in the Indian Premier League for the 2008 & 2009 campaigns. He is a right-handed batsman and right-arm medium pace bowler.

Wilkin started his career in the Mumbai side where he was a squad player. His Mumbai highlight was in the Ranji Trophy Semi-Final in 2007, where he made a battling 33 coming in when Mumbai were 0–5, and then taking 6 wickets in the match to gain an unexpected win.

Career best performances

as of 22 October 2010

References

External links

1981 births
Living people
Cricketers from Mumbai
Indian cricketers
Mumbai cricketers
Punjab Kings cricketers
Tripura cricketers